Minnesota State Highway 27 (MN 27) is a  state highway in west-central and east-central Minnesota, which runs from its intersection with MN 28 in Browns Valley and continues east to its interchange with Interstate 35 (I-35) in Moose Lake. For part of its route (23 miles), it runs concurrently with MN 65 in Kanabec and Aitkin counties between Woodland and Rice River Township.

Route description
MN 27 serves as an east–west route between Browns Valley, Wheaton, Alexandria, Long Prairie, Little Falls, Mille Lacs Lake, and Moose Lake.

The western terminus for MN 27 is its intersection with MN 28 in Browns Valley, near the Minnesota–South Dakota state line at the Little Minnesota River. The Sam Brown Memorial State Wayside Park is located at the western terminus of MN 27 in Browns Valley.

MN 27 crosses the Broadway Bridge at the Mississippi River in Little Falls.

Charles A. Lindbergh State Park is located immediately south of MN 27 and Little Falls on the Great River Road (CR 52).

Father Hennepin State Park is located on MN 27 at the southeast corner of Mille Lacs Lake, one mile (1.6 km) west of Isle.

MN 27, together with MN 65, passes through the Solana State Forest in Aitkin County.

History

Highway 27 was marked in 1934. It replaced part of former State Highway 10 between Wheaton and Herman and part of State Highway 54 from Herman to Roseville Township; the remainder consisted of either concurrencies or new highways authorized in 1933. At this time, it was paved from Wheaton to Herman, along its overlap with U.S. 52 from Alexandria to Osakis, and from its junction with State Highway 28 to Pierz.

It was paved from Long Prairie to its junction with Highway 28 in 1938, and from U.S. 169 to then-State Highway 56 along the south side of Mille Lacs Lake in 1939.

In the early 1940s, paving was done along short segments west of Wheaton, east of Osakis, west of Lastrup, and west of Moose Lake.

After the end of World War II, the remainder of the highway west of Mille Lacs Lake was paved in stages, with these portions complete by 1955.

In 1958, the roadway was realigned; instead of turning northeastward to travel through McGrath, it continued directly east to intersect Highway 65 at a four-way junction with then-State Highway 66.

Highway 27 was relocated in 1961 along the routing of former State Highway 66 from State Highway 47 south of Isle to Highway 65 at Woodland. The 66 designation was simultaneously reused on another highway in Blue Earth County. Its former alignment from 47 to 65 was renumbered as part of State Highway 18. Also in 1961, the highway was paved from the Aitkin-Carlton county line to the existing pavement near its crossing of the Kettle River.

In 1970, the highway was extended through Moose Lake along former U.S. 61 and County Road 8 to an interchange with the newly built Interstate 35.

The last remaining unpaved section, from Highway 65 to the Aitkin-Carlton county line, was paved in 1974.

In 2012, Highway 27 was moved to overlap with I-94 from Alexandria to Osakis, with the old route turned over to Douglas County maintenance and renamed County Road 82. The highway was then routed along what had previously been State Highway 127 to connect with its existing alignment in Osakis.

Major intersections

References

External links

Highway 27 at The Unofficial Minnesota Highways Page

027
Transportation in Traverse County, Minnesota
Transportation in Grant County, Minnesota
Transportation in Douglas County, Minnesota
Transportation in Todd County, Minnesota
Transportation in Morrison County, Minnesota
Transportation in Mille Lacs County, Minnesota
Transportation in Kanabec County, Minnesota
Transportation in Aitkin County, Minnesota
Transportation in Carlton County, Minnesota